Inchon (also called Inchon!) is a 1981 epic war film about the Battle of Inchon, considered to be the turning point of the Korean War. The film was directed by Terence Young and financed by Unification movement founder Sun Myung Moon. It stars Laurence Olivier as General Douglas MacArthur, who led the United States surprise amphibious landing at Incheon, South Korea in 1950. Also featured are Jacqueline Bisset, Ben Gazzara, Toshiro Mifune, and Richard Roundtree. It was filmed in South Korea, California, Italy, Ireland and Japan.

Inchons plot includes both military action and human drama. Characters face danger and are involved in various personal and dramatic situations. The film concludes with the American victory over North Korean forces in the Battle of Inchon, which is considered to have saved South Korea. The film cost $46 million to produce and encountered many problems during production, including a typhoon and the death of a cast member. Both the Unification movement and the United States military provided personnel as extras during the filming.

After premiering in May 1981, the film was released theatrically in the United States and Canada in September 1982, before being quickly withdrawn due to critical and financial failure. It has never been released on home video, although it has occasionally been broadcast on television. It was the largest financial loss in film of 1982, earning less than $2 million against its lofty budget and resulting in losses of around $41 million. Reviewers at the time gave it consistently bad reviews and later commentators including Newsweek, TV Guide and Canadian Press have classed Inchon among the worst films of all time.

Plot
The film depicts the Battle of Inchon during the Korean War, which took place September 15–19, 1950, and is considered the turning point of the war. The protagonist of the film is General Douglas MacArthur, who led the United States surprise amphibious landing at Incheon in 1950. A subplot in the film involves an American couple who encounter difficulties in their relationship because of the ongoing war.

Inchon begins with North Korean soldiers moving past the 38th parallel north into South Korea in June 1950. People flee to the country's capital, Seoul. One of the displaced people is Barbara Hallsworth, a U.S. Army major's wife who lives in a village on the 38th parallel. She is chauffeured to Seoul in a limousine, picking up five South Korean children along the way. After her chauffeur is killed, she drives them to a safe location called the Inn of the Sixth Happiness. Along the way, she shoots a North Korean soldier.

Meanwhile, her husband, Frank Hallsworth, is attempting to break off an affair with a young South Korean woman, Lim. Her father Saito is aware of his daughter's affair with Frank and does not disapprove. Frank receives word of the invasion by the North Koreans, and he travels north in an attempt to locate Barbara with the assistance of army sergeant August Henderson. August encounters Barbara and fixes her vehicle's battery, and then reunites her with Frank.

Journalists David Feld, Park, and Longfellow are attending a press conference held by MacArthur in Tokyo. MacArthur, however, does not show. He agrees with his wife Jean, that he is the only person who can rescue South Korea from the invasion by the North Koreans.

Hallsworth and his former lover succeed in turning on a lighthouse to signal 261 U.S. ships, and the South Korean woman's father activates mines in the channel. She dies during the ensuing battle. The U.S. troops drive out the North Korean forces and the cheering people wave South Korean and American flags. The film proper ends with MacArthur reciting the Lord's Prayer; after this scene, a newsreel of MacArthur is shown.

Cast
Laurence Olivier as General Douglas MacArthur
Jacqueline Bisset as Barbara Hallsworth
Ben Gazzara as Major Frank Hallsworth
Toshiro Mifune as Saito
Richard Roundtree as Sergeant Augustus Henderson
David Janssen as David Feld
Namkoong Won as Park
Karen Kahn as Lim
Rex Reed as Longfellow
Gabriele Ferzetti as Turkish Brigadier
Sabine Sun as Marguerite
Dorothy James as Jean MacArthur

Production

Financing
Sun Myung Moon formed One Way Productions in 1974, with Japanese newspaper publisher Mitsuharu Ishii as its head. Before deciding on making a war film, Moon and Ishii considered making biopics of Jesus or Elvis Presley.  In 1978, psychic Jeanne Dixon was consulted to communicate with the spirit of General MacArthur, and Dixon said that MacArthur's spirit endorsed the production of the film. Dixon also helped choose Terence Young, known for the James Bond films Dr. No, Thunderball, and From Russia with Love, to direct the film.

Inchon was financed by Moon and Ishii. Moon was involved with the film's production from the very beginning. Ishii, a member of the Unification movement in Japan and a friend of Moon, served as the film's producer; and Moon, although credited as "Special Advisor on Korean Matters", contributed $30 million to One Way Productions. Moon initially did not want the public to know that he was behind the financing of the film and its production; however, upon the film's U.S. release, Moon was identified in newspaper ads as the film's "special advisor". Ishii said he was instructed by God to make the film. Additional funding was provided by Robert Standard, the associate producer and a member of the Unification Church of the United States.

Ishii said he was a member of the Unification movement "just like a Catholic is a member of the Catholic Church and I believe Rev. Moon is very sincere about doing the Lord's work". Ishii was president of the World Daily News, which is published by Moon's media conglomerate News World Communications which also published other newspapers, including The Washington Times in the United States.

Inchon was initially budgeted at $18 million, but cost $46 million to produce. Attempts to solicit funding from Japanese banks fell through, and so the entire project was funded by Moon and the Unification Church.

In his book Encyclopedic Handbook of Cults in America, author and scholar of religion J. Gordon Melton noted that "Moon has attempted to project his ideas into all areas of American society" and cited Inchon as an example. Moon later said in a talk to movement members: "Why did we put so much effort into the movie Inchon? No matter what the result the motivation was for people to understand about MacArthur. I wanted to show how MacArthur loved God and loved people. MacArthur came to Japan after World War II and put the nation back together. He really respected and loved the people. He also loved God very much and fought with great strength against tyranny and communism. That is what I want the people to understand."

Writing
Ishii was inspired to write a film with an international cast after watching a South Korean dramatization of the war. He wanted the film to be an "entertaining action film", but also said he was "very interested in depicting MacArthur as a human being and I want the world to know how miserable the war was for the Korean people."

Moore commented on the writing process: "The theme I had to deal with in Inchon was too big for a movie that was less than two hours. When Toho was originally involved, they wanted a love story between an American boy and a Korean girl. My technique is to research and then fictionalize, a technique I used successfully in French Connection. But I had to fictionalize the real landing at Inchon, making it seem that a lighthouse was a pivotal factor when in fact it wasn't. I couldn't do that, which is why other writers were brought in."

Ishii instructed Moore to include an emphasis on General MacArthur's spiritualism and faith in divine guidance. He told Moore to include three separate love stories in the film, "one between two Americans, one between two Koreans, and one between an American and a Korean". Moore explained that "the love stories were supposed to tell the story of the tragedy of Korea, the tragedy of the Korean War". Ishii stated to Moore that he did not wish for the movie to turn into an "anti-Communist tract". Prior to the completion of the film's screenplay, the film's producers encountered difficulties obtaining an affiliation with a movie studio. Ishii said that North Korea placed pressure on Toho Studios through labor unions in Japan, requesting that the studio pulled out of its affiliation with Inchon. The labor unions criticized the film's production, saying that it was influenced by Moon and his Unification movement, in addition to the Korean CIA and was part of an effort to support the president of South Korea. Because of this criticism, Toho Studios canceled its participation in the Inchon project.

Casting
Laurence Olivier was paid $1 million to play General Douglas MacArthur in the film. He was contracted for six weeks of filming, and received a payment of $250,000 upon signing the contract and the remainder was given in four subsequent installments. His salary came out to $50,000 per day. In addition to this fee, Olivier also received $2,500 per week for his expenses. Olivier was interviewed during the film's production and explained why he agreed to be part of its cast: "People ask me why I'm playing in this picture. The answer is simple. Money, dear boy. I'm like a vintage wine. You have to drink me quickly before I turn sour. I'm almost used up now and I can feel the end coming. That's why I'm taking money now. I've got nothing to leave my family but the money I can make from films. Nothing is beneath me if it pays well. I've earned the right to damn well grab whatever I can in the time I've got left."

Olivier researched the role by traveling to Norfolk, Virginia to visit the MacArthur Museum, and speaking with Alexander Haig, who had served as aide-de-camp to MacArthur. Haig told Olivier that MacArthur's voice sounded like W. C. Fields, and Olivier tried to imitate this. He enjoyed working with accents and obtained recordings of MacArthur's voice. He was interested in various inconsistencies in these recordings, and especially in the difference in vowel sounds made by MacArthur. During filming, the makeup process for Olivier took two and a half hours, but after it was complete, he thought he neither looked like himself nor like General MacArthur.

The 72-year-old Olivier, who had been in poor health for years, suffered during filming in Seoul because of the summer heat. Director Terence Young recalled that between takes Olivier lay on a cot, virtually immobile with pain and exhaustion, but that when needed "he dropped fifty years and stepped forward without complaint".

Richard Roundtree, known for the title role in the film Shaft, portrayed the character of Staff Sgt. Henderson in the film. Janssen, known for his role in television series The Fugitive, accepted a part as a journalist to work with Laurence Olivier. Actress Karen Kahn portrayed the young Korean lover of Major Frank Hallsworth in the film. In a subsequent interview with The Press Democrat, Kahn said of the film: "It was supposed to be this Gone with the Wind. And it was the worst movie. It's in some of those worst-films-of-all-time books. After that movie I quit. I just couldn't take L.A. I was really thin-skinned. So I just got out."

Young was paid $1.8 million, Jacqueline Bisset was paid $1.65 million, Ben Gazzara was paid $750,000, David Janssen was paid $300,000, Roundtree was paid $200,000, and Rex Reed was paid $6,000 per week. Prior to Gazzara receiving the role for Frank Hallsworth it was offered to Nick Nolte for $1.5 million. Olivier and Young later sued One Way Productions for $1 million each citing overtime.

Music
Jerry Goldsmith wrote the score for the film. The music was recorded at Rome's Forum Studio in July 1980 and was fraught with difficulties — the studio was not large enough for his orchestra, and room noise made by the players and their equipment affected the tracks.

In spite of the problems, Goldsmith was pleased with his score, describing it as a chance to "create interesting music out of a bad situation". The original 1982 soundtrack LP comprised 38 minutes of music, edited and assembled by Goldsmith and engineer Leonard Engel into an ideal listening experience rather than a chronological one. The album was issued on Regency Records; Intrada Records prepared a remixed edition of the complete score in 1988. In 2006 Intrada revisited the score and issued a two-disc set, with the original LP making its compact disc debut on disc 1 and the entire score presented in film order on disc 2.

Filming
Shooting took place in Hollywood, Rome, Ireland, Tokyo and Seoul. The involvement of Moon was "adamantly denied". Moon recommended editing and reshooting changes to the film's script, which "caused the production to return to South Korea three times, Rome twice and Los Angeles twice."

The film included several technical errors. Cut-out cardboard pieces were used to depict military aircraft during battle scenes in the film, and one film critic said viewers were almost able to identify the threads attached to the cardboard cut-outs. Footage of a digital watch was spliced into the film, though this technology would not be invented for twenty-five years after the film's time period. There were other problems. Bisset developed laryngitis during the film's production. A set-piece for the film included a re-created version of a lighthouse at Incheon, but this was obliterated by a typhoon. The death of David Janssen during production called for extensive reshoots.

During the filming of the landing at Inchon a mistake was made in which the ships turned right rather than left. This was due to an aide, whose walkie-talkie was broken, not relaying the correct information due to fear of embarrassment. The filming mistake cost around $500,000. $1 million was spent to bring the crew back to film the three minute scene depicting MacArthur's victory parade. Principal photography cost $26 million and reshoots in other countries cost $22 million. Sidney Beckerman was paid $350,000 to consult Ishii during the editing process.

The production hired Samuel Jaskilka, a retired Marine Corps Lieutenant General who took part in the Battle of Inchon as a company commander, as technical advisor to the film. The United States Department of Defense allowed 1,500 soldiers from the United States Army and United States Marine Corps to participate as extras in the film, at a cost of $77,000.

The Little Angels Children's Folk Ballet of Korea, founded by Moon in 1962, was featured in the film, along with many Unification movement members. After shooting had finished in South Korea, Olivier returned to England. He was needed in South Korea to shoot the final scene, but as a concession to his poor health, was allowed to film in Rome instead. The film's director Terence Young was not happy with the completed version of the film and said, "the producers have turned Inchon into a Korean propaganda movie." Ishii said: "No problem. We have 20 nations who want this movie."

Release
The world premiere of the film was held in Washington, D.C. on May 4, 1981 at a special screening at the John F. Kennedy Center for the Performing Arts, as a benefit for retired United States Navy personnel chaired by Senator Alfonse D'Amato. This was the only time the film was screened in its 140-minute full version. Between 25 and 100 protesters came to demonstrate outside the Center.

The gala was a benefit for retired Naval personal sponsored by U.S. Senator Al D'Amato, but he declined to attend when it was announced that Moon would be in attendance. Twelve Congressmen signed on as honorary members of the benefit committee. Although an additional forty-eight Members of Congress accepted tickets to the premiere, Lawrence H. Suid wrote in Guts & Glory that "... no more than fifteen or sixteen were willing to brave the pickets outside the Kennedy Center protesting the Unification Church and its involvement with the movie."

On February 13, 1982, President Ronald Reagan, himself a former film actor and president of the Screen Actors Guild, screened the film in the White House. He noted in his diary: "Ran Inchon—it is a brutal but gripping picture about the Korean War and for once we're the good guys and the Communists are the villains. The producer was Japanese or Korean which probably explains the preceding sentence".

Inchon was shown at the 35th Cannes Film Festival in May 1982 but failed to interest any buyers despite a $250,000 publicity campaign, which included hiring the publicity firm Rogers and Cowan to arrange a large party and give out promotional Inchon jackets.

In August 1982, Metro-Goldwyn-Mayer contracted the distribution rights to the film. One Way Productions came to an agreement with MGM that it would take care of the costs associated with advertising and distributing the film if MGM agreed to distribute Inchon for a profit share of only 15 percent. The normal fee for the film distributor was thirty percent of profits. The distributors also convinced Moon to change his credit from spiritual advisor to special advisor. The film, cut to 105 minutes, was released in the United States on the weekend of September 17, 1982. It was swiftly pulled from theater distribution because of its poor performance at the box office, and was never shown in the United Kingdom.

After its release, Inchon was never again shown in theaters, and was never released on videocassette or DVD. It did however air on U.S. cable television outlet Goodlife Television Network, at the time owned by the Unification movement. Bootleg copies of the film circulated from individuals that had copied Inchon from these television broadcasts.

Promotion
The Unification movement wanted to distribute the film on their own, but Young told them this would result in a "total disaster". The Church did however front the full $11 million promotion budget. The press releases made many mystical claims, such as of a B-29 bomber pilot seeing the face of Jesus Christ during the war, or of MacArthur's spirit causing his face to appear on a photograph of his office door. The press kit also claimed that MacArthur had endorsed the film from the spiritual world (MacArthur having died in 1964).

Reception

Box office
The film's total North American gross was $1.9 million. It eventually took in $5.2 million at the box office. Inchon lost over $44 million, and was the year's largest financial failure in film. In 1989, a survey released by the entertainment research firm Baseline identified Inchon as "the biggest box-office fiasco of the 1980s".

Inchon has been included on multiple lists of box office bombs.  Michael Wilmington of the Chicago Tribune placed Inchon as number six in a "list of Hollywood's 10 worst mega-flops". Wilmington noted that Inchon displaced the 1980 film Heaven's Gate as "the bomb of the decade".  The Washington Post described Inchon as "one of the biggest commercial disasters in film history". In 1995, the San Francisco Chronicle reported that The Guinness Book of World Records called Inchon "the biggest money-loser in film history". Inchon was one of the "10 costliest movies", adjusted for inflation, at $173 million in 1997 dollars.  In a 2006 list of "The top 10 biggest box office failures", Kat Giantis of MSN Movies placed Inchon as tied with Battlefield Earth (a science fiction film based on a novel by L. Ron Hubbard, founder of Scientology, the fact this film was based on a book written by the founder of the Scientology religion meant that it was heavily promoted by Scientologists) for number seven.

Reviews
Most newspaper reviewers gave Inchon negative reviews, among them were The Boston Globe, The Philadelphia Inquirer,  The Miami Herald and The Washington Post.  In The New York Times, critic Vincent Canby commented, "Inchon is a hysterical historical epic, somewhat less offensive than The Green Berets and far funnier...Inchon looks like the most expensive B-movie ever made." A review in Variety commented, "Olivier is convincing in his role throughout most of the saga, the only member of the cast to achieve that status. The screenplay generally treats all others as one-dimensional buffoons, giving them lines that are unintentionally laughable. One reason is that all plot digressions are simply window dressing to the film's focus on the brutally invading North Koreans and the big-scale counterattack by the good guys. No speaking roles are given to the Communists, for example."

Moon founded The Washington Times in Washington D.C. as a part of his international media conglomerate News World Communications in the same year Inchon was released. According to The Times''' rival The Washington Post, a full-length two and a half page version of a film review of Inchon written by critic Scott Sublett that was originally planned for the September 16, 1982 issue of The Times was killed by the newspaper's publisher and editor James R. Whelan. Whelan told Sublett that The Times had a conflict of interest with regard to reviewing Inchon, and would not print his review. Instead, The Times printed a one-paragraph critical synopsis of the film, also written by Sublett, which said in full: "Puerile dialogue, perfunctory acting and haphazard construction doom from the start this visually impressive would-be epic about love and dead Reds in wartime Korea. Olivier (in a performance that is the nadir of his career) joshes, minces and rolls his eyes absurdly as Doug MacArthur. The script, by Robin Moore, is pure twaddle – a cross between South Pacific and The Green Berets." Moore is the author of the novel The Green Berets, upon which the 1968 movie was based. On September 21, The Washington Times printed The New York Times′ review of the film. Reviewers Gene Siskel and Roger Ebert selected the film as one of the worst of the year in a 1982 episode of their program Sneak Previews.

Later commentary
Multiple commentators have described Inchon as the worst film ever made, including The Washington Post, Newsweek, TV Guide and the Canadian Press. Inchon was later profiled in multiple books on worst in film, including The Hollywood Hall of Shame by Harry and Michael Medved, and The Worst Movies of All Time by Michael Sauter. In 2000, Kenneth Lloyd Billingsley, writing in the libertarian magazine Reason, said about a proposed film on Stalinism: "A film like this could easily have turned out as big a didactic dud as the Rev. Sun Myung Moon's 1982 bomb, Inchon, with Laurence Olivier as Gen. Douglas MacArthur." A 2009 review by Phil Hall for Film Threat was less negative, and he disagreed with the characterization of the film as the worst ever made, "I was genuinely surprised — this is hardly among the very worst films of all time. That's not to say it is a good film. It is a dull and forgettable movie, and I would never recommend it. However, its reputation for being among the bottom of the cinematic barrel is wholly undeserved."

A review in Brassey's Guide to War Films by Alun Evans was critical, calling the film "Arguably the worst war picture made in the last quarter of the 20th century". Robert Niemi commented in his book History in the Media: Film and Television, "Plagued with a terrible script, horrendous production problems, and shoddy performances all around, the resulting film, Inchon ... was bad beyond belief." Niemi wrote that Olivier's performance "was a low point in an otherwise distinguished film career". In his biography of the actor, Olivier, author Terry Coleman called the film "probably the worst he ever made and one of the best paid". Author Lawrence H. Suid wrote in Guts and Glory: The Making of the American Military Image in Film'' that "what combat the film portrayed lacked any believability or authenticity... As a result, the movie met with almost unanimous critical disdain."

Accolades

See also

 Box-office bomb
 List of films considered the worst
 Unification Church and North Korea

References

Works cited

Further reading

External links
 
 
 
 

 

1981 films
1980s war drama films
1981 drama films
American war drama films
English-language South Korean films
Films about Douglas MacArthur
Films about the United States Marine Corps
Films directed by Terence Young
Films scored by Jerry Goldsmith
Films set in Incheon
Films set in Seoul
Films set in Tokyo
Films set in the 1950s
Films shot in Ireland
Films shot in Los Angeles
Films shot in Rome
Films shot in Seoul
Films shot in Tokyo
Films sponsored by the Unification Church
Korean War films
Metro-Goldwyn-Mayer films
Film controversies
Political controversies in film
South Korean war drama films
Unification Church and the arts
United States in the Korean War
Golden Raspberry Award winning films
1980s English-language films
1980s American films